The NZASM 19 Tonner 0-4-2T of 1891 was a South African steam locomotive from the pre-Union era in Transvaal.

In 1891 and 1892, the Nederlandsche-Zuid-Afrikaansche Spoorweg-Maatschappij of the Zuid-Afrikaansche Republiek (Transvaal Republic) placed 24 tank locomotives with a 0-4-2 wheel arrangement in service.

Between 1906 and 1909, ten of them were converted to railmotor engines by the Central South African Railways, for use on suburban passenger services.

Manufacturers
The first ten of eventually twenty-four tank locomotives with a 0-4-2 wheel arrangement, built in two batches of five by Emil Kessler's Maschinenfabrik Esslingen in 1890, were placed in service by the Nederlandsche-Zuid-Afrikaansche Spoorweg-Maatschappij (NZASM) in 1891 and numbered in the range from 21 to 30.

Since they proved to be useful locomotives, an order for six more of the type was placed with Machinefabriek Breda voorheen Backer & Rueb (Breda machine factory, formerly Backer & Rueb). They were built in 1891 and 1892 and were numbered in the range from 15 to 20. For some reason, possibly their delivery sequence, their numbering was not in the same sequence as their works numbers.

Eight more 19 Tonners were delivered from Maschinenfabrik Esslingen in 1892, numbered in the range from 31 to 38.

Characteristics
The locomotive's trailing wheels were positioned below the firebox. The cylinders were arranged outside the frames, with flat Murdoch's D slide valves arranged at an incline above the cylinders and actuated by Allan straight link valve gear, driven by eccentric sheaves which were mounted on a return crank. The brakes were actuated by hand screw from the cab.

Service

NZASM
At the time the 19 Tonners entered service, the Randtram line and the extensions towards the east to Springs and towards the west to Roodepoort were open. The extension from Roodepoort to Krugersdorp was opened on 10 February 1891, while the extension from Germiston to Pretoria was still in progress and would only be completed in December 1892. These are the lines on which the 19 Tonners entered service.

Imperial Military Railways
All railway operations in the two Boer Republics, the Zuid-Afrikaansche Republiek (ZAR) and the Oranje-Vrijstaat (OVS), were taken over by the Imperial Military Railways (IMR) in 1899 during the Second Boer War. The IMR renumbered the 19 Tonners in the range from 612 to 635.

Central South African Railways
At the end of the war, when the IMR was transformed into the Central South African Railways (CSAR), 22 of the 19 Tonners had survived the hostilities. Five, IMR numbers 613 and 631 and three more, had been sold by the IMR. The other seventeen were renumbered by the CSAR in the letter range from F to V, following on from the 18 Tonner renumbering.

Three 19 Tonners were retired from CSAR service and converted to stationary boilers, numbered in the range from 1735 to 1737. Between 1906 and 1909, ten of them were converted to railmotor engines for use on suburban passenger services. This entailed being semi-permanently coupled to a modified side-door suburban passenger carriage which contained a driving cab at the rear, with the regulator, reversing gear and brake controls arranged so that the push-pull unit could be driven from either vehicle. These railmotor engines were renumbered M1 and in the range from M3 to M11.

Railmotor coach no. M1 seated 28 1st Class and 24 2nd Class passengers.

The skipped railmotor engine number was allocated to a Kitson-built railmotor with a 56-seat passenger capacity which was placed in service in 1907. In service, the imported railmotor no. M2 was found to be less satisfactory than the home-built railmotor engine no. M1, which was considered to be superior in aspects like design, passenger comfort, economy in running and convenience in working. Since the imported railmotor was a single vehicle, the carriage was unusable while the engine had to be withdrawn for service or repairs. The Pretoria-built modified carriage was still readily detachable from the locomotive and both engine and carriage were still complete units which could be used independently of each other.

The initial service on the Pretoria-Rissik and Pretoria-Wonderboom sections attracted so many passengers that it soon became necessary to run a three-coach train. Since several 19 Tonners were standing idle, no more railmotors were ordered and, instead, another nine 19 Tonners were converted to railmotor engines and renumbered in the range from M3 to M11. Between 1906 and 1909, steam railmotor services were expanded to operate on four routes:
 Hatherley-Pretoria-Wonderboom.
 Elsburg-Germiston-Rietfontein Mine.
 Luipaardsvlei-Krugersdorp-Randfontein.
 Germiston-Geduld.

South African Railways
When the Union of South Africa was established on 31 May 1910, the three Colonial government railways (Cape Government Railways, Natal Government Railways and CSAR) were united under a single administration to control and administer the railways, ports and harbours of the Union. Although the South African Railways and Harbours came into existence in 1910, the actual classification and renumbering of all the rolling stock of the three constituent railways was only implemented with effect from 1 January 1912.

In 1912, the ten railmotor engines were taken onto the SAR roster as unclassified locomotives, since they were considered obsolete. Since they were excluded from the SAR renumbering schedules, they retained their CSAR engine numbers, but at some stage their boilers were allocated SAR boiler numbers in the range 4000 and 4002 to 4010. The skipped no. 4001 was used for the Kitson railmotor's boiler. All of them were withdrawn from service by 1921.

Industry
At least five 19 Tonners were sold to industry before the formation of the CSAR. Known locomotives in industrial service were one at Coronation Colliery, one at Douglas Colliery and one at Transvaal Coal Trust in Brakpan, which later went to Ogies Colliery. The one at Ogies was only scrapped c. 1930 and may have been the last survivor.

The Douglas Colliery locomotive was their no. 1 and was named Douglas. It bore a Breda works plate and was therefore one of the batch from the NZASM number range from 15 to 20. Since, out of the Breda group, NZASM no. 16 is the only one which definitely did not pass to the CSAR, and since there is uncertainty over whether or not NZASM no. 20 became one of CSAR numbers J, K or L, it follows that either no. 16 or no. 20 became Douglas Colliery no. 1.

Works numbers and renumbering
The 19 Tonner NZASM numbers, builders, works numbers, years built, IMR renumbering, CSAR renumbering, CSAR railmotor engine conversion date or stationary boiler renumbering, and SAR boiler numbering are listed in the table.

Illustration

References

0810
0-4-2 locomotives
B1 locomotives
Esslingen locomotives
Machinefabriek Breda locomotives
Cape gauge railway locomotives
Railway locomotives introduced in 1891
1891 in South Africa
Scrapped locomotives